The 1982 Florida Federal Open was a women's tennis tournament played on outdoor hard courts at the East Lake Woodlands Racquet Club in Tampa, Florida in the United States that was part of the Toyota Series circuit of the 1982 WTA Tour. It was the 10th edition of the tournament and was held from October 11 through October 17, 1982. The final was watched by a crowd of 6,150 spectators who saw first-seeded Chris Evert-Lloyd win the singles title and earn $22,000 first-prize money.

Finals

Singles
 Chris Evert-Lloyd defeated  Andrea Jaeger 3–6, 6–1, 6–4
 It was Evert-Lloyd's 8th singles title of the year and the 118th of her career.

Doubles
 Ann Kiyomura /  Paula Smith defeated  Mary-Lou Piatek /  Wendy White-Prausa 6–0, 6–1

Prize money

References

External links
 ITF tournament edition details

Eckerd Open
Florida Federal Open
Florida Federal Open
20th century in Tampa, Florida
Sports competitions in Tampa, Florida
Florida Federal Open
Florida Federal Open